1906 earthquake may refer to:

1906 Aleutian Islands earthquake (great)
1906 Ecuador–Colombia earthquake (great, tsunami)
1906 Meishan earthquake (Taiwan)
1906 San Francisco earthquake (California, US) (great)
1906 Swansea earthquake (United Kingdom)
1906 Valparaíso earthquake (Chile) (great, tsunami)
1906 Manasi earthquake (China)

See also
List of earthquakes in 1906